Dana Biosphere Reserve is Jordan's largest nature reserve, located in south-central Jordan. Dana Biosphere Reserve was founded in 1989 in the area in and around the Dana village and Wadi Dana comprising .

Human presence
The people of the Ata'ta (or Al Atata) tribe are the native inhabitants of Dana Biosphere Reserve. Their history in Dana dates 400 years, with human settlement in the area dating back more than 6000 years. Besides the presence of the Ata'ta people, archeological discoveries suggest Palaeolithic, Egyptian, Nabataean, and Roman settlement in Dana.

Accommodations
Visitors to Dana Nature Reserve and Dana village can stay at Dana Cooperative Hotel and other accommodations.

Geography
The varied geology of Dana contains limestone, sandstone, and granite. The area of Wadi Dana features wind-cut sandstone cliffs. Dana is the only nature reserve in Jordan that crosses four bio-geographical zones; Mediterranean, Irano-Turanian, Saharo-Arabian, and Sudanian penetration.

Geology
Dana's unique landscape is formed by an outcrop (exposed bedrock) of fluvial sandstone, dating back to the Paleozoic and Lower Cretaceous. It is also covered by shallow marine carbonate rocks from the Upper Cretaceous and Tertiary period. The area around Dana is further characterized by a horst (called the Dana Horst) formed by two faults running from East to West, which are the Salawan fault and the Dana fault. The Horst contains Precambrian Granitoids and volcanic rocks in contact with Cretaceous rocks. The origin of this basaltic formation is believed to be from two distinct volcanic eruptions: the first dating back to somewhere between the Miocene and Pleistocene, while the second is a highly recent eruption of the nearby Jabal Al-Qadisyah.

Flora and fauna
The diverse environment of Dana is home to 703 plant species, 215 species of birds, and 38 species of mammals.

Plants
Dana is the most diverse area of plant life in the country, consisting of numerous vegetation types including: Phoenician juniper, evergreen oak, sand dunes, acacia, and rocky sudanian. Dana is the southernmost area in the world to host the Mediterranean cypress, Cupressus sempervirens. Of the hundreds of plants species inhabiting Dana, three can be found nowhere else in the world. Many plants, especially trees and shrubs, grow in the highlands of the nature reserve.

Endangered species
The threatened Nubian ibex, Syrian serin, caracal, and lesser kestrel are natives of Wadi Dana and plans to save the species were put forth by Global Environment Fund in 1994. Additionally, the largest breeding colony of the Syrian serin is in Dana Nature Reserve. Threats to the animals include hunting.

See also
 Mujib Nature Reserve
 Azraq Wetland Reserve
 List of nature reserves in Jordan

References

External links

 Dana from the American center of oriental research.
 Dana Biosphere Reserve
 Dana Community Cooperative
 The Royal Society for the Conservation of Nature
 Dana Cooperative Hotel

Biosphere reserves of Jordan
Nature reserves in Jordan
Horsts (geology)